SSC may refer to:

Businesses
 Shanghai Supercomputer Center, a high-performance computing service provider
 Shared services center, outsourcing
 SSC North America, an automobile manufacturer
 Specialized System Consultants, a private media company
 Swedish Space Corporation, a Swedish government owned company
 Southern Star Central Gas Pipeline, Inc, based in Owensboro, KY
 Syrian Satellite Channel, a satellite television channel owned by RTV Syria

Education
 Student selected components, optional elements in the syllabus of UK medical schools
 Secondary School Certificate, the certificate given to students graduating from a secondary school in India, Pakistan or Bangladesh
 Secondary School Leaving Certificate examination

Educational institutions

Hong Kong
 St Stephen's College, Hong Kong, in Stanley, Hong Kong Island
 St. Stephen's Girls' College, Hong Kong, in Pok Fu Lam, Hong Kong Island

Australia
 Sydney Secondary College, a public school in Sydney, Australia
 St Stanislaus' College, Bathurst, New South Wales
 Santa Sabina College, Strathfield, New South Wales
 Saint Stephen's College, Coomera, Queensland
 Saint Scholastica's College, Australia

Philippines
 St. Scholastica's College, Manila, Philippines
 San Sebastian College – Recoletos in Manila, Philippines

United States
 Saint Stanislaus College, a high school in Bay St. Louis, Mississippi
 Salem State University, a public college in Salem, Massachusetts
 Seminole State College (Oklahoma), a public college in Seminole, Oklahoma
 Seminole State College of Florida, a public college in Seminole County, Florida
 South Seattle College, a two-year public college in Seattle, Washington
 South Suburban College, a community college in South Holland, Illinois

Groups and organizations
 Sangha Supreme Council, governs Buddhism in Thailand
 Saudi Space Commission, government agency of Saudi Arabia
 Sector skills councils in the UK, employers' organisations for reducing skills gaps
 Shared Services Canada
 Sierra Student Coalition, a student-run arm of the Sierra Club, an environmental organization in the United States
 Singapore Symphony Chorus, choir of the Singapore Symphony Orchestra
 SkyscraperCity, an online forum for urban discussion
 Society of the Holy Cross (Societas Sanctae Crucis), traditionalist Anglo-Catholic society of male priests
 Society of Solicitors in the Supreme Courts of Scotland, a professional association of solicitors
 Space Systems Command, the acquisition, research and development, and launch command of the United States Space Force
 Species Survival Commission of the International Union for Conservation of Nature
 Staff Selection Commission, conducts  entry exams for Indian Government staff
 State Security Council of apartheid South Africa
 State Services Commission of New Zealand, oversees NZ public sector performance
 Statistical Society of Canada, promotes use and understanding of statistical methods
 Sunni Students Council, council for Muslim students headquartered at Kerala
 Swiss Science Council, independent scientific advisory body of the Federal Council of Switzerland

Places
 Shaw Air Force Base, South Carolina, U.S. (FAA code)
 Stennis Space Center,  Mississippi
 Second Severn Crossing, a motorway bridge across the River Severn from England to Wales
 U.S. Army Soldier Systems Center, Natick, Massachusetts
 Sool, Sanaag, and Cayn, three provinces in Somalia collectively known as Khatumo State since 2012
HBM-SSC, Militia based in SSC region
 Shetland Space Centre, a proposed spaceport in Scotland

Science and technology

Technologies
 Thrust SSC, world's first supersonic land vehicle and current land speed record holder
 Ship-to-Shore Connector, a future air-cushion vehicle (hovercraft) of the United States Navy
 Soft structured carrier, a soft (often fabric) baby carrier
 Sistema Supporto Condotta, a kind of automated railway signaling in use on the Italian railway network
 Static synchronous compensator (STATCOM), a power electronics voltage-source converter

Life sciences
 Systemic sclerosis, a form of scleroderma
 Secondary sclerosing cholangitis, a chronic cholestatic liver disease
 California species of special concern, a legal protective designation for at-risk wildlife in the state of California
 SSC buffer, a saline sodium citrate buffer commonly used in molecular biology and organic chemistry
 Stretch shortening cycle, a process of faster muscular contraction after a dynamic stretch

Physical sciences
 Spatial Synoptic Classification system, which is a way of diagnosing the climate of a location using air mass theory
 Sulfide stress cracking, a type of corrosion
 Super star clusters, in astronomy, possible progenitors of globular clusters
 Superconducting Super Collider, a colliding beam particle accelerator partially built in Texas by the US government before being canceled in 1993

Computing and information technology
 IBM Secure Service Container
 Shanghai Supercomputer Center, a high-performance computing service provider
 Synchronous serial communication
 Synchronous Serial Controller
 Spread-spectrum clocking, a technique used to reduce electromagnetic interference (EMI) produced by synchronous digital systems (such as computer systems)
 SQL Server Compact, a small-footprint database from Microsoft
 Supplementary service codes
 SinuSoidal Coding used for audio in MPEG-4 Part 3

Sports
 Saudi Sports Company, company of a television network
 Sinhalese Sports Club Ground, a venue for international cricket matches in Colombo, Sri Lanka
 Sinhalese Sports Club, a first-class cricket club based in Colombo, Sri Lanka
 Southern States Conference, a defunct NAIA conference in the United States
 Speed Skating Canada
 Sunshine State Conference, a sports organization in Florida

Other uses
 Hull classification symbol for coastal submarine
 Safe, sane and consensual, a practice in BDSM
 Scottish Submarine Centre, a naval museum in Scotland
 Slate Star Codex, a blog by Scott Alexander